GolAZ is a former Russian bus manufacturer belonging to the GAZ Group. Its "Golitsynsky Bus Plant" is located in Moscow's Odintsovsky District. The company specializes in designing and manufacturing of intercity buses and coaches of the large and extra-large class.

Until 2013 it produced city buses; buses of this brand were booked for the Olympic games 2014 in Sochi. The brand was discontinued in 2014 and the factory now makes agricultural machines.

Reception / Awards 
GolAZ buses received a number of rewards. GolAZ-4244 model received the title "Best Domestic Bus 2002 in Russia". In August 2003 GolAZ received a special prize for the creation of a bus "Cruise". Its flagship model GolAZ AKA-6226. Bus model has received the title of "Russian".

Models

Current 
 GolAZ-LiAZ-5256 (2003–) - A large class motor coach.
 GolAZ-5291 "Cruise" (2003–) - A large class tourist bus.
 GolAZ-6228 (2008– ) - Extra large class city bus polunizkopolny triaxial.
 GolAZ-6228-10 - Motor coach extra large class.
 GolAZ-5251 "Voyage" (2013–) - A large class of long-distance bus. Production began in the first half of 2011.
 GolAZ-525110 - Intercity bus class built on Scania K IB chassis. Production began in the first half of 2012.

Historical 
 GolAZ AKA Vityaz /GolAZ AKA Lider (1990–1994) -licensed copy of Mercedes-Benz O303
 GolAZ-5225 Rossiyanin (1994–2000?) - licensed copy of Mercedes-Benz O405
 GolAZ AKA-6226 Rossiyanin (1994–2000?) -licensed copy of articulated bus Mercedes-Benz O405G
 GolAZ-4242 (1999–2002)

Gallery

References 

Bus manufacturers of Russia
GAZ Group
Companies based in Moscow Oblast